Fabio Guardigli (born 21 October 1968) is a Sammarinese alpine skier. He competed in three events at the 1988 Winter Olympics.

References

1968 births
Living people
Sammarinese male alpine skiers
Olympic alpine skiers of San Marino
Alpine skiers at the 1988 Winter Olympics
Place of birth missing (living people)